Cercospora rosicola is a fungal plant pathogen mostly found on plants in the United States, specifically within the state of Texas. The fungi mostly affects roses, and in severe infections can cause defoliation.

Symptoms 
Infected plants may show small purple-brown lesions sporadically around the surface of the leaves.

References

External links

rosicola
Fungal plant pathogens and diseases